NJN may refer to the following:

New Jersey Network, the former statewide public television and radio network in New Jersey, a member of PBS and NPR
New Jersey Nets, a former American professional basketball team in the National Basketball Association (NBA)